The following lists events that happened during 1946 in the People's Republic of Albania.

Incumbents
President: Omer Nishani, Chairman of the Presidium of the Constituent Assembly
Prime Minister: Enver Hoxha, Chairmen of the Council of Ministers

Events

January
 January 11 - The People's Republic of Albania was proclaimed at noon (1100 GMT), with Communist leader Enver Hoxha as the nation's Prime Minister. Two months later, a new constitution proclaimed Hoxha's Albanian Workers Party to be the sole force, and Marxism–Leninism as the ideology, of the People's Socialist Republic of Albania.

References

 
1940s in Albania
Years of the 20th century in Albania